Women of Trachis or The Trachiniae c. 450–425 BC, is an Athenian tragedy by Sophocles.

Women of Trachis is generally considered to be less developed than Sophocles' other works, and its dating has been a subject of disagreement among critics and scholars.

Synopsis
The story begins with Deianeira, the wife of Heracles, relating the story of her early life and her plight adjusting to married life.  She is now distraught over her husband's neglect of her family. Often involved in some adventure, he rarely visits them. She sends their son Hyllus to find him, as she is concerned over prophecies about Heracles and the land he is currently in. After Hyllus sets off, a messenger arrives with word that Heracles, victorious in his recent battle, is making offerings on Cape Cenaeum and coming home soon to Trachis.

Lichas, a herald of Heracles, brings in a procession of captives. He tells Deianeira a false story of why Heracles had laid siege to the city of Oechalia (in Euboea). He claimed Eurytus, the city's king, was responsible for Heracles being enslaved, and therefore Heracles vowed revenge against him and his people. Among the captured girls is Iole, daughter of Eurytus. Deianeira soon learns that in truth Heracles laid siege to the city just to obtain Iole, whom he has taken as a lover.

Unable to cope with the thought of her husband falling for this younger woman, she decides to use a love charm on him, a magic potion that will win him back.  When she was younger, she had been carried across a river by the centaur, Nessus. Halfway through he made a grab at her, but Heracles came to her rescue and quickly shot him with an arrow. As he died, he told her his blood, now mixed with the poison of the Lernaean Hydra in which Heracles' arrow had been dipped, would keep Heracles from loving any other woman more than her, if she follows his instructions. Deianeira dyes a robe with the blood and has Lichas carry it to Heracles with strict instructions that (a) no one else is to wear it, and (b) it is to be kept in the dark until he puts it on.

After the gift is sent, she begins to have a bad feeling about it. She throws some of the left-over material into sunlight and it reacts like boiling acid. Nessus had lied about the love charm. Hyllus soon arrives to inform her that Heracles lies dying due to her gift. He was in such pain and fury that he killed Lichas, the deliverer of the gift: "he made the white brain to ooze from the hair, as the skull was dashed to splinters, and blood scattered therewith" (as translated by Sir Richard C. Jebb).

Deianeira feels enormous shame for what she has done, amplified by her son's harsh words, and kills herself.  Hyllus discovers soon after that it wasn't actually her intention to kill her husband. The dying Heracles is carried to his home in horrible pain and furious over what he believes was a murder attempt by his wife. Hyllus explains the truth, and Heracles realizes that the prophecies about his death have come to pass: He was to be killed by someone who was already dead, and it turned out to be Nessus.

In the end, he is in so much pain that he is begging for someone to finish him off. In this weakened state, he says he is like a woman. He makes a final wish, which Hyllus promises to obey (under protest), that Hyllus is to marry Iole. The play concludes with Heracles being carried off to be burned alive, as an ending to his suffering.

Date
The date of the first performance of Women of Trachis is unknown, and scholars have speculated a wide range of dates for its initial performance.  Scholars such as T.F. Hoey believe the play was written relatively early in Sophocles' career, around 450 BC. Often cited as evidence for an early date is the fact that the dramatic form of Women of Trachis is not as developed as those of Sophocles' other surviving works, advancing the belief that the play comes from a younger and less skilled Sophocles. Additionally, the plot of the play is similar to a story related by Bacchylides in Bacchylides XVI, but in some respects significantly different from earlier known versions of Bacchylides' story. From this, Hoey and others have argued that Sophocles' interpretation was more likely to have influenced Bacchylides than vice versa. Serving as further evidence is the relationship between the character of Deianeira and that of Clytemnestra in Aeschylus' Oresteia, first produced in 458. In earlier known versions of this story, Deianeira has several masculine qualities, similar to those of Clytemnestra – who, in the Oresteia, purposely kills her husband Agamemnon. In Women of Trachis, however, Deianeira's character is softer and more feminine, and she is only inadvertently responsible for her husband's death. According to some scholars, Deianeira's character in Women of Trachis is intended as a commentary on Aeschylus' treatment of Clytemnestra; if so, Women of Trachis was probably produced reasonably soon after the Oresteia, although it is also possible that such commentary was triggered by a later revival of Aeschylus' trilogy. Hoey also sees echoes of Aeschylus' Prometheus Bound, particularly in the relevance of Women of Trachis to debates that were occurring during the 450s on the "relationship between knowledge and responsibility."

Other scholars, such as Cedric H. Whitman, argue for a production date during the 430s, close to but probably before Oedipus Rex. Evidence for a date near Oedipus Rex include a thematic similarity between the two plays. Whitman believes the two plays represent "another large step in the metaphysics of evil, to which Sophocles devoted his life." Thomas B. L. Webster also estimates a date in the 430s, close to 431, for a variety of reasons. One reason Webster gives for this dating is that there are a number of similarities between Women of Trachis and plays by Euripides that were known to be written between 438 and 417, and so may help narrow the range of dates, although it is unknown which poet borrowed from the other. A stronger reason Webster gives for this dating is that he believes that the structure of Woman of Trachis is similar to that of Sophocles' lost play Tereus, which Webster dates to this time period based largely on circumstantial evidence from Thucydides. Finally, Webster believes that the language and structure of Women of Trachis are consistent with such a date.

Other scholars, including Michael Vickers, argue for a date around 424 or 425, later than the generally accepted date range for the first performance of Oedipus Rex. Arguments in favor of such a date include the fact that events of the play seem to reflect events that occurred during the Peloponnesian War around that time. The Spartans believed they were descended from Heracles, and in 427 or 426, Sparta founded a colony in Trachis called Heraclea. The colony alarmed Athens, who feared the colony could be used to attack Euboea, and in Women of Trachis Heracles is said to be either waging war or planning to do so against Euboea. Vickers believes that the link to current events and to Sparta accounts for why Heracles is portrayed so coldly in the play. Vickers also argues that Sophocles chose the name "Lichas" for Heracles' messenger as a result of the link to current events, as Lichas was the name of a prominent Spartiate envoy during the war.

Translations
 1892 – Richard C. Jebb: prose
 1906 – Lewis Campbell: verse
 1912 – Francis Storr: verse: full text
 1938 – Esther S. Barlow: verse
 1956 – Ezra Pound: verse
 1957 – Michael Jameson: verse
 1966 – Robert Torrance: verse (Full Text)
 1990 – J. Michael Walton: verse
 1994 – Hugh Lloyd-Jones: prose
 2001 – Paul Roche: verse
 2007 – George Theodoridis: prose: full text
 2015 – Bryan Doerries: prose
 2015 – Keyne Cheshire: adaptation to mythic Wild West setting, Murder at Jagged Rock
 2018 – Ian C. Johnston: verse: full text
 2021 - Rachel Kitzinger and Eamon Grennan: verse: full text

Commentaries
 Gilbert Austin Davies, 1908 (abridged from the larger edition of Richard Claverhouse Jebb)
 Easterling, Patricia E. (1982) Trachiniae. Cambridge Greek and Latin Classics. Cambridge University Press.

References

Further reading
 Easterling, P. E. 1981. "The End of the Trachiniae." Illinois Classical Studies 6:56–74.
 Finglass, P. J. 2016. "A New Fragment of Sophocles’ Tereus." Zeitschrift für Papyrologie und Epigraphik 200:61–85
 Heiden, B. 1989. Tragic Rhetoric: An Interpretation of Sophocles’ Trachiniae. Hermeneutic Commentaries 1. New York and Frankfurt: Peter Lang.
 Kraus, C. S. 1991. "“Λόγος μὲν ἔστ᾽ ἀρχαῖος”: Stories and story-telling in Sophocles’ Trachiniae." Transactions of the American Philological Association 121:75–98.
 Levett, B. 2004. Sophocles: Women of Trachis. London: Duckworth.
 Long, A. A. 1968. Language and Thought in Sophocles: A Study of Abstract Nouns and Poetic Technique. Univ. of London Classical Studies 6. London: Athlone.
 Rood, N. J. 2010. "Four Silences in Sophocles’ Trachiniae." Arethusa 43:345–364.
 Segal, C. 1994. "Bride or Concubine? Iole and Heracles’ Motives in the Trachiniae." Illinois Classical Studies 19:59–64.
 Segal, C. 1977. "Sophocles’ Trachiniae: Myth, Poetry, and Heroic Values." Yale Classical Studies 25:99–158.
 Sorum, C. E. 1978. "Monsters and the Family: The Exodos of Sophocles’ Trachiniae." Greek, Roman, and Byzantine Studies 19:59–73.

External links

 Women of Trachis at Perseus Digital Library
 Study guide from Temple University
 
 Open access translation from Lever Press

Plays by Sophocles
Mythology of central Greece
Plays set in ancient Greece
Plays based on classical mythology